Rock Canyon is located in the Wasatch Mountains, in east Provo, Utah, United States. It is popular with rock climbers and hikers (and a number of other outdoor enthusiasts of all types) due to its unique and rugged geology as well as its proximity to Brigham Young University. The mouth of the canyon is located just behind the Provo Utah Temple.

Notable features in the canyon

 Kyhv Peak (formerly Squaw Peak)
 Cascade Mountain
 Lake Bonneville Shoreline
 Wasatch Fault
 Monarch Mine (Buckley Mine)
 Spanish Moss Cave
 Red Baron Cave

History

Recorded history of the canyon begins with the conflicts between Mormon settlers based at Fort Utah and the indigenous Timpanogos tribe living in Utah Valley in 1850. A contingent of Timpanogos, under the direction of Big Elk, fled to Rock Canyon following a battle with the Mormon militia. Squaw Peak is the name the settlers gave to the peak north of Rock Canyon, after Big Elk's wife who died in the canyon in the conflict. Some pictographs still exist from early Indian writings. There are large mineral deposits in the canyon and many shafts and tunnels still exist which may be explored. Various rock climbing routes also exist throughout the canyon.

Wildlife
Rock Canyon is home to a number of large game animals and it is common for visitors to observe deer, bighorn sheep, or other species.

Geology 
Rock canyon shows excellent outcrops of dominantly Paleozoic age rocks, with Precambrian Tillite at the mouth of the canyon, and Quaternary colluvium and glacial deposits in the canyon. Rock canyon preserves a record of multiple phases of the area, including:

 Deposition and lithification of sediment
 North-south bedding parallel shortening
 Folding (top to the east), associated with thrust faulting
 Exposure from Wasatch normal faulting
 Stream erosion of the canyon
Folding in the canyon has mad may of the beds perpendicular to the trail. As you walk up the canyon you are walking up the depositional sequence. Rock units seen in outcrop in the canyon from mouth of the canyon (oldest) to back of the canyon (youngest) are as follows:

 Mineral Fork Tillite. Olive colored, fine matrix with larger clasts.
 Tintic Quartzite. Tan to orange in color, highly fractured, with original cross bedding still visible from deposition as a sandstone.
 Ophir Formation. 
 Maxfield Limestone. 
 Fitchville Dolomite
 Gardison Limestone
 Deseret Limestone
 Humbug Formation.
 Great Blue Limestone Formation.
 Manning Canyon Shale.
 Oquirrh Group (Bridal Veil Falls, Bear Canyon, Shingle Mill, and Wallsburg Ridge Formations)

See also
 List of canyons and gorges in Utah

Notes

References

External links

 BYU Geology Department's Rock Canyon Site
 Information on climbing Squaw Peak
 Mineral information for Buckley Mine
 Rock Canyon Climbing
 Preserve Rock Canyon
 Rock Canyon Preservation Alliance
 Rock Canyon Spelunking

Canyons and gorges of Utah
Canyons and gorges of Utah County, Utah
Tourist attractions in Utah County, Utah
Wasatch Range